Marl Lake is a freshwater lake located in Roscommon County in the U.S. state of Michigan. The lake is entirety located within South Higgins Lake State Park. The lake is within Markey Township to the south and Gerrish Township to the north. The two are connected by the Cut River, and upon exiting Marl Lake, the Cut River continues to flow into Houghton Lake.

The lake can be reached through a state park access point along East Higgins Lake Road (County Road 100). The waters may be difficult to fish due to its grassy nature and very loose marl bottom, but common fish within the lake include smallmouth bass, rock bass, sunfish, and several other small varieties. Kayaking, bird watching, photography, shore fishing, and picnicking are also popular activities.

References

Lakes of Michigan
Bodies of water of Roscommon County, Michigan
Protected areas of Roscommon County, Michigan
Tourist attractions in Roscommon County, Michigan